Robert David "Bob" Stumpf (April 25, 1953 – February 17, 2013) was a Canadian professional ice hockey player. He played 10 games in the NHL with the St. Louis Blues and Pittsburgh Penguins during the 1974–75 season.

External links
 

1953 births
2013 deaths
Canadian ice hockey defencemen
Denver Spurs players
Estevan Bruins players
Hershey Bears players
Ice hockey people from Alberta
New Westminster Bruins players
People from Vulcan County
Philadelphia Flyers draft picks
Pittsburgh Penguins players
Quebec Nordiques (WHA) draft picks
Red Deer Rustlers players
Richmond Robins players
St. Louis Blues players